André Simonazzi (born 1968) is a Swiss journalist born in Monthey. He currently holds the office of Vice Chancellor and spokesman for the Swiss Federal Council, since April 2009.

Simonazzi attended  the Collège de l’Abbaye in St. Maurice, where he obtained a Latin and English baccalaureate in 1988.

The eldest son of an economics teacher at the St. Maurice's Abbey, André Simonazzi graduated at the Graduate Institute of International Studies in Geneva. After beginning a career as a journalist at the regional newspaper Le Nouvelliste, André Simonazzi first joined the relief organization Caritas Switzerland's media department, before becoming its national spokesman in 1998.

In 2004, he joined the Federal Department of Environment, Transport, Energy and Communications (DETEC), initially as Deputy Head of the Information Service, then as Head between 2004 and 2009.

André Simonazzi was appointed Spokesman for the Federal Council on 12 November 2008 with effect from 1 April 2009.

Personal life
Simonazzi is of Italian descent.

References 

Living people
1968 births
Swiss politicians
Swiss people of Italian descent
People from Monthey
Graduate Institute of International and Development Studies alumni